Marcjanka may refer to the following places in Poland:
Marcjanka, Łódź Voivodeship (central Poland)
Marcjanka, Masovian Voivodeship (east-central Poland)